Sheikh Izzeddin Esfarayeni, who wrote under the pseudonyms of Hasanoghlu and Pur-e Hasan, was a 13th and 14th century poet who wrote in Azerbaijani and Persian. He is the earliest known author of Azerbaijani literature.

Hasanoghlu was born in Esfarayen in the 13th century. He was a student of Sheikh Jamaladdin Ahmed Zakir, the head of one of the Sufi sects. During his lifetime, Hasanoghlu was well-known, with his fame reaching as far as Anatolia. His lyrics influenced many generations of Turkic-language poets.
Hasanoghlu primarily composed lyric poems about love that were infused with Sufi ideology. He composed a diwan of Azerbaijani and Persian ghazals. Only three of Hasanoghlu's poems have survived.

References

Literature 

 
 
 
 
 
 
 
 

Azerbaijani-language poets
Persian-language poets
Year of birth unknown
14th-century deaths
13th-century births